Foy W. "Bo" Watson (born October 21, 1960) is an American politician and a Republican member of the Tennessee Senate, representing the 11th district since 2007.

Biography
Bo Watson was born on October 21, 1960 in Chattanooga, TN. He is the son of Doris Juanita (Hoppe) and Foy W. Watson, Jr. He is married to Nicole (nee Osborne) Watson, an attorney at Waller Lansden Dortch & Davis, LLP. He has one son, Grey Watson.

Education 
Watson graduated in 1979 from the Baylor School (a private school located in Chattanooga, Tennessee) where he was a state high school wrestling champion.

He graduated magna cum laude from the University of Tennessee at Chattanooga in 1983 with a B.A. in biology and received his education and training in physical therapy at the University of Tennessee Center for Health Sciences in Memphis, Tennessee.

Religion 
Watson attends First Presbyterian Church of Chattanooga.

Career 
Watson has been a practicing physical therapist for over 30 years and he is currently the Director of Sports Medicine and Therapy Services at HCA-Parkridge Medical Center in Chattanooga, Tennessee.

Election 
Watson was first elected as a TN state senator in 2006 for the 105th Tennessee General Assembly, having previously served as a state representative during the 104th General Assembly. He represents the 11th district, which encompasses part of Hamilton County. From July 2011 until January 2017, he was Speaker pro tempore in the Tennessee Senate.

In 2018, Watson ran against Randall Price in the general election for Tennessee State Senate District 11. On November 6, 2018, Watson defeated Price in the election.

Committees/Community Outreach 
In January 2017 Watson became chairman of the Senate Finance, Ways and Means Committee. He is chairman of the Senate Rules Committee, Chairman of the Joint Committee on Pensions and Insurance, member of the Senate Health and Welfare Committee, the Senate Commerce and Labor Committee and the Fiscal Review Committee.

Watson is a past board member of the Baylor School Alumni Association and is a past member on the Baylor School Board of Trustees. He has been involved in the Junior Achievement program at Orchard Knob Elementary School and Habitat for Humanity. Watson is an American Heart Association Volunteer and a past board member of the Wesley Center at UTC. He is also a past board member of the American Cancer Society Relay for Life and a past board member of the University of Tennessee National Alumni Association.

References

1960 births
Living people
Republican Party Tennessee state senators
Politicians from Chattanooga, Tennessee
University of Tennessee at Chattanooga alumni
21st-century American politicians
American United Methodists